Bayadere was an Indian silk fabric with a horizontal stripe pattern.

Etymology 

Structure and pattern 
Bayadere was made using both plain and twill weaves. The fabric was either woven with weft stripes or printed. The stripes were made with bright and strongly contrasting colors. Moire bayadere is a bayadere with a wavy pattern.

See also 

 Sussi (cloth)

References 

Woven fabrics